Johan Linander (born 1974) is a Swedish Centre Party politician, member of the Riksdag since 2002.

References

1974 births
Living people
Members of the Riksdag 2002–2006
Members of the Riksdag 2006–2010
Members of the Riksdag 2010–2014
Members of the Riksdag from the Centre Party (Sweden)